Nana Plaza (formerly Nana Entertainment Plaza) is an entertainment complex and red-light district in Bangkok, Thailand. It describes itself as the "worlds largest adult playground". Its name originates from the influential, property-holding Nana family, Lek Nana being the most prominent member.

Along with Soi Cowboy and Patpong, Nana Plaza is one of Bangkok's three most concentrated red-light districts. All attract primarily tourists.

History
The plaza's U-shaped building is roughly square-shaped, with a single opening on the west side, and consists of a ground floor and two additional floors arranged around a courtyard. It started as a restaurant and shopping center in the late-1970s. During the early-1980s, a few go-go bars appeared and gradually replaced the shops and restaurants. By the mid-1980s around twenty go-go bars had opened in the three-level court, taking advantage of the expansion of tourist hotels in the area.

In 2012 Nana Plaza was sold to a Thai JVC company Nana Partners Co Ltd., co-owned by Fico corporation and Panthera Group (formally known as Eclipse group)one of Thailand's largest bar and nightclub operatorsfor a rumored US$25,000,000 after the land was inherited by seven sisters who wanted nothing to do with a red-light area. Panthera Group renovated the complex, becoming the landlord and providing the management and security services.

Facilities
Three short-time hotels, one of which has been renovated, operate on the top floor. Short-time hotels rent out rooms by the hour or more to patrons to take a bargirl for sex. Most bar girls in Nana Plaza will leave with customers upon payment of a bar fine. Smoking is banned indoors. There are two elevators, one on the north side of the building and one on the south. The building closes at 03:00 and lies dormant until the following evening. In 2016 two waitresses in the plaza's Bangkok Bunnies go-go bar said that they received monthly wages equivalent to £130 (US$165) and daily tips equivalent to £11–16 (US$14–20). This compares with a 2016 average monthly wage in Thailand of around 13,800 baht (US$388).

As of July 2019, Nana Plaza housed 30 bars and three "hotels".

As of July 2019, there were seven kathoey ("ladyboy") bars in Nana Plaza; Several other bars have a few ladyboys in their line-ups mixed with their regular go-go dancers.

Gallery

See also
 Nightlife in Bangkok
 Prostitution in Thailand

References

External links 

 Official Nana Plaza Website
 Interview With Paul Hayward, Owner Of Nana Plaza

Kathoey
Neighbourhoods of Bangkok
Red-light districts in Thailand
Khlong Toei district